Andrew Watt may refer to:
Andrew Watt (lacrosse) (born 1984), professional lacrosse player for the Buffalo Bandits
Andrew Watt (record producer) (born 1990), American guitarist, singer and songwriter
Andrew Alexander Watt (1853–1928), Anglo-Irish businessman
Andrew Watt (meteorologist) (1869–1929), Scottish meteorologist

See also
Andrew Wyatt, American musician, songwriter and record producer
Andrew Watts (disambiguation)